Arthur George Negus, OBE (1903–1985) was a British television personality and antiques expert, specialising in furniture.

Biography 
Negus was born in Reading, Berkshire, to Amy Julia Worsley and father Arthur George Negus Sr, a cabinet maker. His family has had a long history in the antiques business. Negus was educated at Reading School and began running the family business when he was 17, following the death of his father. During World War II he was an air-raid warden. He later joined the company of Bruton, Knowles & Co., auctioneers of antiques based in Gloucester.

For many years Negus resided in Cheltenham.

Broadcasting career 
His broadcasting career began at the age of 62 when he appeared on the panel of the television series Going for a Song (1965–1977), where he appraised antiques. He quickly became a household name as a result of his slow and distinctive West Country speech style, which in turn also made him popular with impersonators. He returned to television with Arthur Negus Enjoys (1982) and, especially, Antiques Roadshow (1979–1983). He was mentioned in the 1970 Monty Python "Election Night Special" sketch, and again two episodes later in the sketch "Archaeology Today". He also appeared on other TV programmes including several editions of The Generation Game during the time it was presented by Bruce Forsyth and Larry Grayson.

Honours and legacy
Negus was appointed to the Order of the British Empire in 1982. He died in 1985 at his home in Cheltenham exactly one week after having turned 82.

In April 2013 Negus's daughter Anne appeared on BBC One's Antiques Roadshow with the Negus family Bible, owned by her great-grandparents Charles and Harriet Negus, which had been shown in a previous edition of the show in Wimbledon. Since discovering the bible, the Negus family had been able to trace its ancestors back to the 1700s.

Bibliography
 Going for a Song: English Furniture (1969)
 The Arthur Negus Guide to English Clocks (1980) – foreword by Negus, remainder of text by David Barket
 A Life Among Antiques: Arthur Negus Talks To Bernard Price (1982)

References

Sources

External links

 Pick of the Past: Heelas, Arthur Negus and Dennis J Hands at getreading.co.uk

1903 births
1985 deaths
Antiques experts
British television presenters
Civil Defence Service personnel
Officers of the Order of the British Empire
People educated at Reading School
People from Reading, Berkshire